An annular solar eclipse will occur on January 10, 2168. A solar eclipse occurs when the Moon passes between Earth and the Sun, thereby totally or partly obscuring the image of the Sun for a viewer on Earth. An annular solar eclipse occurs when the Moon's apparent diameter is smaller than the Sun's, blocking most of the Sun's light and causing the Sun to look like an annulus (ring). An annular eclipse appears as a partial eclipse over a region of the Earth thousands of kilometres wide.

Visibility 
The annular eclipse will be over Africa and Asia. The partial eclipse will be visible across China, Japan, Southeast Asia, most of Africa, and Europe.

Related eclipses

References 

2168 1 10
2168 1 10
2168 1 10
2160s